Faujdarhat Junction Railway Station is situated at Faujdarhat, Chittagong, Bangladesh, at the side of Dhaka-Chittagong highway. It is close to Chittagong Railway Station. It has two platforms.

References

Railway junction stations in Bangladesh
Railway stations in Chittagong District